The 2021–22 Esteghlal Football Club season was the club's 76th season in existence and the 28th consecutive season in the top flight of Iranian football. In addition to the domestic league, Esteghlal participated in this season's editions of the Hazfi Cup, and the AFC Champions League (2021). The club will not compete in the AFC Champions League (2022) after failing to obtain an AFC license. The season covered the period from 13 September 2021 to 30 May 2022.

Players

Squad information
Last updated:

Transfers

In

Out

Pre-season and friendlies

Competitions

Overview

Persian Gulf Pro League

Standings

Results summary

Results by round

Matches

Score overview

Hazfi Cup

AFC Champions League

Knockout stage

Statistics

Squad statistics

|-
! colspan="18" style="background:#dcdcdc; text-align:center"| Players transferred/loaned out during the season

Goals
The list is sorted by shirt number when total goals are equal.

Clean sheets

Assists Goal
The list is sorted by shirt number when total Assists Goal are equal.

Disciplinary record
Includes all competitive matches. Players with 1 card or more are included only.

Notes

References

External links
 Iran Premier League Statistics
 Persian League

Esteghlal F.C. seasons
Esteghlal